Leona Pouncey Thurman (1911 – 1985) was an American attorney who became Kansas City, Missouri's first African American female lawyer. She was also Missouri's first African American female lawyer to practice before the Supreme Court of the United States.

Early life and education 
She was born on July 1, 1911 in Russellville, Arkansas. Before settling in Kansas City, Missouri, she attended the Henderson Business College in Memphis, Tennessee. She earned her law degree in 1949 from Howard University School of Law

Career 
After earning her Bachelor of Laws in 1949, she became the first African American female lawyer in Kansas City.

In 1962, she became the first African American female from Missouri admitted to practice before the U.S. Supreme Court. Additionally, Thurman served as the President of the Southwest Bar Association.

Personal life 
Thuman married her first husband, James D. Pouncey, in 1937, and pursued a legal career after his death. She married a second time in 1957 to A. Odell Thurman, a school administrator. Thuman died on May 1, 1985 in Kansas City, Missouri.

See also 

 List of first women lawyers and judges in Missouri

References 

People from Russellville, Arkansas
Lawyers from Kansas City, Missouri
20th-century American lawyers
African-American women lawyers
Howard University School of Law alumni
1911 births
1985 deaths
African-American lawyers
20th-century American women lawyers
20th-century African-American women
20th-century African-American people